The 2005 Sultan Qaboos Cup was the 33rd edition of the Sultan Qaboos Cup, the premier knockout tournament for football teams in Oman.

The competition began on 1 September 2005 with the Group Stage and concluded on 14 November 2005. Dhofar S.C.S.C. were the defending champions, having won their sixth title in 2004. On Monday 14 November 2005, Al-Nasr S.C.S.C. were crowned the champions of the 2005 Sultan Qaboos Cup when they defeated Al-Seeb Club 3-1, hence winning the title for the fourth time.

Teams
This year the tournament had 32 teams. The winners qualified for the 2006 AFC Cup.
 Ahli Sidab Club (Sidab)
 Al-Hamra SC (Al-Hamra)
 Al-Ittihad Club (Salalah)
 Al-Kamel Wa Al-Wafi SC 
 Al-Khaboora SC (Al-Khaboora)
 Al-Mudhaibi SC (Al-Mudhaibi)
 Al-Musannah SC (Al-Musannah)
 Al-Nahda Club (Al-Buraimi)
 Al-Nasr S.C.S.C. (Salalah)
 Al-Oruba SC (Sur)
 Al-Rustaq SC (Rustaq)
 Al-Salam SC (Sohar)
 Al-Seeb Club (Seeb)
 Al-Shabab Club (Seeb)
 Al-Suwaiq Club (Suwaiq
 Al-Tali'aa SC (Sur)
 Al-Wahda SC (Sur)
 Bahla Club (Bahla)
 Bidia SC (Bidiya)
 Bowsher Club (Bawshar)
 Dhofar S.C.S.C. (Salalah)
 Fanja SC (Fanja)
 Ibri Club (Ibri)
 Ja'lan SC (Jalan Bani Bu Ali)
 Khasab SC (Khasab)
 Majees SC (Majees)
 Mirbat SC (Mirbat)
 Muscat Club (Muscat)
 Nizwa Club (Nizwa)
 Oman Club (Muscat)
 Quriyat Club (Quriyat)
 Saham SC (Saham)
 Samail SC (Samail)
 Salalah SC (Salalah)
 Sohar SC (Sohar)
 Sur SC (Sur)
 Yanqul SC (Yanqul)

Group stage

Group A

Group B

Group C

Group D

Group E

Group F

Group G

Group H

Group Stage Results
The first match played was between Bahla Club and Ja'lan SC on 1 September 2005. 16 teams advanced to the Round of 16.

Round of 16
16 teams played a knockout tie. 8 ties were played over one leg. The first match was played between Dhofar S.C.S.C. and Sur SC on 6 October 2005. 8 teams advanced to the quarterfinals.

Quarterfinals
8 teams played a knockout tie. 4 ties were played over one leg. The first match was played between Sur SC and Al-Tali'aa SC on 13 October 2005. Sur SC, Al-Oruba SC, Al-Nasr S.C.S.C. and Al-Seeb Club qualified for the semifinals.

Semifinals
4 teams played a knockout tie. 2 ties were played over two legs. The first match was played between Sur SC and Al-Seeb Club on 20 October 2005. Al-Nasr S.C.S.C. and Al-Seeb Club qualified for the Finals.

1st Legs

2nd Legs

Third Place

Finals

References

External links
Oman Sultan Cup 2005-2006 at Goalzz.com

Sultan Qaboos Cup seasons
Cup